Earth Quake is an American power pop band, formed in the San Francisco area in 1966, who released several albums in the 1970s, mostly on Beserkley Records, a company which they were involved in setting up.

Band members
John Doukas - lead vocals
Robbie Dunbar - guitar, piano, vocals
Stan Miller - bass, vocals
Steve Nelson - percussion, vocals
Gary Phillips - guitar, vocals, lead vocals

Career
Originally Purple Earthquake, the band drew its influences from rock and blues bands of the 1950s and 1960s, such as The Kinks, Muddy Waters and the Yardbirds, and played clubs and ballrooms in California in the late 1960s.  They were managed by Matthew King Kaufman, who got a recording contract for them with A&M Records, where they released two albums, Earth Quake (1971) and Why Don't You Try Me? (1972), but with little commercial success. 

After experiencing frustration at what he saw as A&M's incompetence in handling the band, and winning some compensation for the unauthorized use of their music in the movie The Getaway, Kaufman set up Beserkley Records in 1973. Earth Quake released four albums on Beserkley between 1975 and 1979, as well as working with other musicians including Jonathan Richman (who they backed on his 1974 recording of "Roadrunner"), Greg Kihn (who sang backing vocals on some of their records), and guitarist Gary Phillipet (a.k.a. Gary Phillips, previously of John Cipollina's Copperhead). The band split up in the early 1980s, although a compilation album, Sittin in the Middle of Madness, was issued in 2000.

The first two albums, Earth Quake (1971) and Why Don't You Try Me? (1972), were remastered and rereleased December 27, 2004 on Acadia Records.

Gary Phillips died in 2007, at the age of 59. John Doukas, musician and historical documentary director and producer, died on March 19, 2011, in South Africa, at the age of 62.

Albums
Earth Quake (A&M, 1971)
Why Don't You Try Me? (A&M, 1972)
Rocking The World (Beserkley, 1975)
8.5 (Beserkley, 1976)
Leveled (Beserkley, 1977)
Spitballs (Beserkley, 1978; multi-artist compilation)
Two Years In A Padded Cell (Beserkley, 1979)
Sittin in the Middle of Madness (compilation, Castle Music, 2000, reissued 2003)

References

External links
 Robbie Dunbar bio

1966 establishments in California
American power pop groups
Musical groups established in 1966
Musical groups from the San Francisco Bay Area